Felix Johannes Oinas (6 March 1911 – 25 September 2004) was an Estonian folklorist, linguist, and translator.

Early life and career
Felix Oinas was born in Tartu to dairy farmer Ernst Oinas an his wife and Marie (née Saarik), who was a homemaker. He grew up in the village of Maltsa. Ernst had a keen interest in literature and maintained a small library and Felix became an avid reader during elementary school, particularly interested in Estonian folklore and literature.

Felix Oinas attended the University of Tartu, receiving his M.A in Finno-Ugric languages, folklore, and comparative literature in 1938. He later taught the Estonian language at University of Budapest in Hungary, as well as conducting research on Hungarian literature, and translating Hungarian works into Estonian.

After returning to Estonia, Oinas fled the Soviet occupation and annexation in 1945 with his wife Lisbet and children. While living as displaced persons in Germany, Oinas studied Slavic linguistics and literature. In 1949, the family emigrated to the United States after Oinas was hired as a research assistant for the Slavic Department at Wayne State University in Detroit. After a year in Detroit, he moved to Bloomington, Indiana and taught Finno-Ugric languages and folklore at Indiana University Bloomington. Oinas also became a Russian language instructor while simultaneously studying theoretical and Slavic linguistics and working at the Folklore Institute with American folklorist Stith Thompson.

In 1952, Oinas received his PhD in linguistics. Oinas taught Russian and Old Church Slavonic at Indiana University Bloomington's Slavic Department in addition to folklore. In 1961, he received Fulbright and Guggenheim grants to conduct research at Helsinki University, and in 1964 he received a second Guggenheim fellowship, which he used to conduct research in Zagreb, Croatia.

In 1960, Oinas was appointed chairman of Indiana University Bloomington's Ural-Altaic Department, and later became a professor in the Slavic and Ural-Altaic Departments and at the Folklore Institute. Oinas taught Church Slavonic, Russian Literature, reading of Old Slavonic texts, and the history of Russian literary language. In the folklore department he taught Russian, Finnish, and Balto-Finnic folklore, Finno-Ugric and Siberian mythology, and religion.

Oinas published 23 books, 250 articles, 130 reviews, and translated several books from Hungarian into English. Some of the most notable areas of work by Oinas included Finnic and Slavic folklore, the relation of Finnic folklore compared to Baltic (Latvian and Lithuanian) folklore, mythology (particularly the study of spirits, ghosts, devils, and vampires), the study of Slavic and Finnic etymologies, and as an expert on the Estonian epic Kalevipoeg and the Finnish epic Kalevala.

Personal life and death
Feix Oinas married Lisbet Kõvve. Their son Valdar Oinas is an astrophysicist. Oinas died in 2004 in Bloomington, Indiana, aged 93.

Honors
In 1997 Felix Oinas was awarded with Order of the National Coat of Arms, II class.

Selected works
 Petőfi: vabaduse ja armastuse laulik. Eesti Kirjanduse Selts, Tartu, 1939
 Kalevipoeg kütkeis ja muid esseid rahvaluulest, mütoloogiast ja kirjandusest. Toronto, 1979
 Vargamäe tõde ja õigus. Stockholm, 1984
 Surematu Kalevipoeg. Tallinn, 1994
 Tuul heidab magama. Tallinn, 1999

References

1911 births
2004 deaths
Estonian folklorists
Linguists from Estonia
Estonian Finno-Ugrists
Estonian translators
Estonian scholars
Estonian educators
University of Tartu alumni
Indiana University Bloomington faculty
Estonian World War II refugees
Estonian emigrants to the United States
Recipients of the Order of the National Coat of Arms, 2nd Class
People from Tartu